Chichiabad (also Romanized as Chīchīābād and Chichīyābād; also known as Chechīābād, Chīchakābād, and Chīchīkābād) is a village in Qareh Chay Rural District, in the Central District of Saveh County, Markazi Province, Iran. At the 2006 census, its population was 15, in 4 families.

References 

Populated places in Saveh County